Antlers Hotel may refer to:

Antlers Hotel (Colorado Springs, Colorado), also known as The Antlers
Antlers Hotel (Spirit Lake, Iowa),  listed on the National Register of Historic Places (NRHP)
Antlers Hotel (Raquette Lake, New York)
Antlers Hotel (Lorain, Ohio), listed on the NRHP
Antlers Hotel (Kingsland, Texas)

See also
Antler (disambiguation) (which includes places named "The Antlers")